Lileah is a rural locality in the local government area (LGA) of Circular Head in the North-west and west LGA region of Tasmania. The 2016 census recorded a population of 77 for the state suburb of Lileah.

History 
Lileah was gazetted as a locality in 1973. Lileah is believed to be an Aboriginal word meaning “fresh water”. 

The settlement name was taken from Mount Lileah, which is in the locality.

Geography
The Arthur River forms part of the southern boundary.

Road infrastructure 
Route C219 (South Road) runs through from north to west.

References

Towns in Tasmania
Localities of Circular Head Council